Dirk Benedict (born Dirk Niewoehner; March 1, 1945) is an American film, television and stage actor, and author. He is best known for playing the characters Lieutenant Starbuck in the original Battlestar Galactica film and television series and Lieutenant Templeton "Faceman" Peck in The A-Team television series. He is the author of Confessions of a Kamikaze Cowboy and And Then We Went Fishing.

Early life
Benedict was born Dirk Niewoehner in Helena, Montana, the son of Priscilla Mella (née Metzger), an accountant, and George Edward Niewoehner, a lawyer. He grew up in White Sulphur Springs, Montana. He graduated from Whitman College in 1967.
Benedict allegedly chose his stage name from a serving of Eggs Benedict he had prior to his acting career. He is of German extraction.

Career

Benedict's film debut was in the 1972 film Georgia, Georgia. When the New York run for Butterflies Are Free ended, he received an offer to repeat his performance in Hawaii, opposite Barbara Rush. While there, he appeared as a guest lead on Hawaii Five-O. The producers of a horror film called Sssssss (1973) saw Benedict's performance in Hawaii Five-O and promptly cast him as the lead in that movie. He next played the psychotic wife-beating husband of Twiggy in her American film debut, W (1974). Benedict starred in the television series Chopper One, which aired for one season in 1974. He made two appearances in Charlie's Angels. He also appeared on the Donny & Marie variety show.

Benedict's career break came in 1978 when he appeared as Lieutenant Starbuck in the movie and television series Battlestar Galactica. The same year Benedict starred in the TV film Cruise into Terror, and appeared in the ensemble movie Scavenger Hunt the following year.

1980s and 1990s
In 1980, Benedict starred alongside Linda Blair in an action-comedy movie called Ruckus. In 1983, Dirk gained further popularity as con man Lieutenant Templeton "Face" Peck in 1980s action television series The A-Team. The second season episode "Steel" includes a scene at Universal Studios where Face is seen looking bemused as a Cylon walks by him as an in-joke to his previous role in Battlestar Galactica. The clip is incorporated into the series' opening credit sequence from season 3 onward.

In 1986, Benedict starred as low-life band manager Harry Smilac in the movie Body Slam along with Lou Albano, Roddy Piper, and cameo appearances by Freddie Blassie, Ric Flair, and Bruno Sammartino. His character Smilac ends up managing the pro-wrestler "Quick Rick" Roberts (Piper) and faces opposition by Captain Lou and his wrestling tag-team "the Cannibals".

In 1987, Benedict took the title role of Shakespeare's Hamlet at the Abbey Theatre in Manhattan. Both his performance and the entire production were lambasted by critics. Benedict starred in the 1989 TV film Trenchcoat in Paradise.

In 1991, Benedict starred in Blue Tornado, playing Alex, call sign Fireball, an Italian Air Force fighter pilot. Benedict published an autobiography, Confessions of a Kamikaze Cowboy: A True Story of Discovery, Acting, Health, Illness, Recovery, and Life (Avery Publishing ). In 1993, Benedict starred in Shadow Force.

Benedict also appeared as Jake Barnes in the 1996 action-adventure film Alaska.

2000s and 2010s
In 2000, Benedict wrote and directed his first screenplay, Cahoots. Benedict appeared in the 2006 German film Goldene Zeiten ("Golden Times") in a dual role, playing an American former TV star as well as a German lookalike who impersonates him.

In 2006, he wrote an online essay criticizing the then-airing Battlestar Galactica re-imagined series and, especially, its casting of a woman as his character, Starbuck, writing that "the war against masculinity has been won" and that "a television show based on hope, spiritual faith, and family is unimagined and regurgitated as a show of despair, sexual violence and family dysfunction".

He appeared as a contestant on the 2007 UK series of Celebrity Big Brother 5, which he placed 3rd. He arrived on launch night in a replica of the A-Team van, smoking a cigar and accompanied by the A-Team theme tune.

In 2010, Benedict starred in a stage production of Prescription: Murder playing Lieutenant Columbo for the Middle Ground Theatre Company in the UK. Benedict also made a cameo appearance in the 2010 film adaptation of The A-Team as Pensacola Prisoner Milt.

In 2019, Benedict took on the role of Jack Strange in the B movie Space Ninjas, written and directed by Scott McQuaid. Dirk plays an eccentric TV host of a show called Stranger Than Fiction, which is like a hybrid of The Twilight Zone and The X-Files. The movie is a sci-fi comedy horror that follows a bunch of high school students trying to survive the night of a Space Ninja invasion.

Personal life

Cancer
In the 1970s, Benedict survived a prostate tumor, which he refused to have tested for malignancy. Having rejected conventional medical treatment, he credited his survival to the adoption of a macrobiotic diet recommended to him by actress Gloria Swanson.

Marriage and family
In 1986, he married Toni Hudson, an actress with whom he has two sons, George and Roland.  Hudson had previously appeared as Dana in the fourth season A-Team episode titled "Blood, Sweat and Cheers". They divorced in 1995.

In 1998, Benedict learned that he also has another son, John Talbert (born 1968), from an earlier relationship, who had been placed for adoption. With the help of his adoptive parents, Talbert discovered and contacted his birth parents.

Filmography

Film

Television

References

External links

 
 
 
 

1945 births
20th-century American actors
21st-century American actors
Male actors from Montana
American male film actors
American male television actors
American people of German descent
Living people
People from Helena, Montana
Whitman College alumni
People from White Sulphur Springs, Montana
American male writers
American male stage actors